The South-Central Zone Cultural, Nagpur or SCZCC one of the seven Zonal Cultural Centres in India was established in 1986 with its headquarters at Nagpur.  It comprises the linguistically different states of Andhra Pradesh, Karnataka, Madhya Pradesh, Telangana, Chhattisgarh, Goa and Maharashtra.  Each of these States has rich traditions of folk, tribal, fine arts and crafts.  The Centre strives through its various activities to enrich, promote and strengthen these traditions. The centre is working under the control of Ministry of  Culture, Government of India. The Governor of Maharashtra is the chairman of this centre.

Other Regional Cultural Centres of India 
 East Zone Cultural Centre, Kolkata, West Bengal
 North-East Zone Culture Centre, Chümoukedima, Nagaland
 West Zone Cultural Centre, Udaipur, Rajasthan
 South Zone Culture Centre, Tanjavur, Tamil Nadu
 North-Central Zone Culture Centre, Allahabad, Uttar Pradesh
 North Zone Culture Centre, Patiala, Punjab

The Cultural Zones of India are seven overlapping zones defined by the Ministry of Culture of the Government of India to promote and preserve the cultural heritage of various regions of India.

References 

Cultural centres in India
Nagpur